Joseph Victor Gonzales (born June 22, 1960, Kuala Lumpur) is a Malaysian choreographer, who is professionally known as Joseph Gonzales. Currently, he is a recognized expert in the choreography and interpretation of traditional dances in Malaysia, prominent in the theater and in the field of dance pedagogy (he published a number of significant books and journal articles). He is widely regarded as one of the leading voices in Asia and specifically Southeast Asia.
In 2011, he established the ASK Dance Company, a private, professional dance company in Malaysia with the aspiration to provide a space for greater professionalism in dance. Through this company, he works to revitalize and revive traditional dances of Malaysia via Forging Traditions, as well as produce both traditional performances and innovative contemporary dance productions.

Brief biography 
Joseph Victor Gonzales was born in the city of Kuala Lumpur, Malaysia on 22 June 1960. He received his elementary school education at the La Salle Primary School and secondary education at the La Salle Secondary School in Petaling Jaya, Malaysia.

In 1986, he graduated from the Mathematical Department of the Faculty of Natural Sciences University of Malaya. He received dance training and choreographic education at the Davis Ballet School in Sussex (1987-1990), the London Studio Center (1991), simultaneously completing the Royal Academy of Dance and Imperial Society of Teachers of Dance accreditation (1992) in England. In 2006, he completed his master's program at Middlesex University. In 2010 he defended his doctoral dissertation at University of Malaya.

Dance and teaching activities

He started dancing as a student, in 1981-1984 he participated in the choreographic ensemble "Kesuma" of the University of Malaya and at the Frances Ballet Academy, and in 1984-1986 at the Federal Academy of Ballet. In 1992-1994 he was a full-time ballet, modern dance, tap and jazz dance teacher at the Federal Academy of Ballet. In this times, he served as Assistant Artistic Director to Lee Lee Lan for the Kuala Lumpur Dance Theatre. From 1994 - he worked as a lecturer at the National Academy of Arts, Culture and Heritage (ASWARA formerly known as National Arts Academy), and became Dean of the Faculty of Dance in 1998. He remained in this position until 2015. He served as President of MyDance Alliance (1999-2001), Co-Chairman of the Asian Dance Committee, Seoul, South Korea (2011-2017), adjudicator for the Singapore Youth Festival since 2008, and Sprouts, a young choreographers’ platform in Singapore as well as Vice-President South East Asia World Dance Alliance (2011-2016).

In Malaysia, he championed a multicultural system of dance education that was truly pioneering. This resulted in dance graduates with the capacity to inhabit numerous dance languages that enabled them to create exciting choreography and educational pathways locally and abroad. Students under his tutelage went on to pursue higher education on full scholarships to Hong Kong, Korea, USA, England, Taiwan and Germany. This has seen a new generation of young Malaysian dance graduates with postgraduate degree qualifications. He has also been committed to the highest performance standards, with students majoring and performing across cultures and borders from classical ballet to Bharatanatyam. He was responsible for the revival and revitalization of numerous Malay dance forms incorporating it into the curriculum or presenting them as part of public performances. These include "Tari Inai", "Terinai", "Joget Gamelan" and much more.

In 2016, he was appointed as a professor and Head of Academic Studies/MFA Program Leader in Dance at The Hong Kong Academy for Performing Arts.

Creativity 

He has participated and presented his creative work in choreographic festivals in Kuala Lumpur, Singapore, Japan, Belgium, Indonesia, China, Japan, India, Korea, Hong Kong, Australia and New Zealand. In 1993 he took part in the Opening ceremony of the XIX International Festival of Independent Cinema in Brussels and in 1998 - the 16th Commonwealth Games in Kuala Lumpur. He represented Malaysia at the Philadelphia Dance Festival (2000), and presented his research papers at several international conferences across the globe.

Under his leadership at ASWARA, he produced innumerable ground-breaking productions celebrating traditional dance and multicultural identity such as "Main Zapin", "Tapestry", "Asyik", "Crossing Borders in Bharatanatyam", "Hang Li Po" as well as being the Artistic Director of the international Tari series, a festival of international universities of the arts from 1998 to 2014. His personal productions can be described as an avant-garde ballet and cutting edge contemporary dance, notable for its originality of dance ideas and techniques. His credo: "Dance and you will enjoy freedom".

Productions and performances of recent years: "P. Ramlee, Musical " (2007) at the Palace of Culture in Kuala Lumpur, “Hamlet” (2007), “Passion” (2007) at the Kuala Lumpur Performing Arts Center, ”Rhythms in Bronze” (2011), The Two (2013) ), "Rise" (2013) in the Penang Center for the Performing Arts, "Enter/Exit" (2014), "Suara (2011) "The Last Tea Party" (2013) for ASWARA, "Becoming King… the Pakyung Revisited" (2014 and 2015), and "Seru" (2016).

Since 1999, his choreography presentations have begun to reflect more deeply the issues he is passionate about - giving voice to the disenfranchised and marginalized, as well as addressing the social and political challenges that are deeply embedded in society. In 2011, he established a professional dance company ASK Dance Company that presents work in Malaysia and at international festivals. The company also promotes and revives traditional Malay dances through its Forging Traditions outreach program supported by Sime Darby Foundation. http://www.askdancecompany.com/

Awards 
 "Outstanding Service" (Ministry of Culture, Art and Tourism of Malaysia, 2001)
 "Best production of the year" (Society of Art Lovers "Kaki Seni", 2003.2008)
 "Crosscultural Champion of the Arts" (Boh Cameronian Arts Awards (2007). 
 "Outstanding contribution to the development of dance" (Academy Kshetra, 2010)
 "Outstanding contribution to the development of dance" (Rotary Club, 2011)
 "Outstanding Service" (National Academy of Arts, Culture and Heritage, 2011)
 "Best Choreographer of the Year" (2016)
 "Game-changer of the Year" (Kakiseni 2019)

Publications 
Joseph Gonzales & Imran Syafiq. Forging Traditional Dance in Malaysia. https://doi.org/10.54165/9789887928522. Published. 2021-10-18
Joseph Gonzales.Makyung in Contemporary Malaysia: Strategies for Preservation and Proliferation. Crossref DOI link: https://doi.org/10.1080/15290824.2019.1683564. Published: 2021-04-03
 Joseph Gonzales. Dancing the Malaysian. Kuala Lumpur: SIRD, 2010. 
 Joseph Gonzales. Dancing Mosaic: Issues On Dance Hybridity. Mohd Anis Md Nor (Ed.). Kuala Lumpur: Cultural Center University of Malaya & National Department for Culture and Arts, Ministry of Information, Communication and Culture, 2012. 
 Joseph Gonzales. South East Asia report. - in: Asia-Pacific CHANNELS. Newsletter of the World Dance Alliance 2, December 2012. Australian Dance Council-Ausdance Inc.
 Joseph Gonzales. Malaysian Dancescapes. Kuala Lumpur: ASWARA, 2014. 
 Joseph Gonzales. Koreografi Kontemporari Malaysia. Kuala Lumpur. SIRD, 2019. 

1960 births
Living people
Contemporary dance choreographers
Malaysian choreographers
Dance in Malaysia
Malaysian male dancers
Malaysian dancers